Abdulrahman Mohamed Abdullaham (born 1 October 1963) is a retired Emirati footballer. He played as a defender for the UAE national football team and Al-Nasr Club in Dubai.

Mohamed played in the 1990 FIFA World Cup and was the captain of the team in the match against West Germany.

References

External links
 
 

1963 births
Living people
Emirati footballers
1988 AFC Asian Cup players
1990 FIFA World Cup players
Al-Nasr SC (Dubai) players
United Arab Emirates international footballers
UAE Pro League players
Association football defenders